This article concerns the period 829 BC – 820 BC.

Events and trends
 828 BC/827 BC (14th year in the era of Gònghé)—King Xuan of Zhou becomes King of the Zhou Dynasty of China, ending almost two decades of the Gonghe Regency.
 828 BC—Xiong Yan is replaced by his son Xiong Shuang as Viscount of Chu.
 825 BC—Takelot II, king of Egypt, dies. Crown Prince Osorkon III and Shoshenq III, sons of Takelot, battle for the throne.
 825 BC/824 BC—Ariphron, King of Athens, dies after a reign of 20 years and is succeeded by his son Thespieus.
 825 BC—Dido, founder of Carthage flees Tyre after the death of Acerbas 
 823 BC—Death of Shalmaneser III, king of Assyria. He is succeeded by his son Shamshi-Adad V.
 821 BC—Xiong Xun, youngest brother of Xiong Shuang, ascends the throne of Chu after defeating his surviving brothers Xiong Xue and Xiong Kan.
 820 BC—Pygmalion ascends the throne of Tyre.

Significant people
 Amaziah, king of Judah, born (approximate date).

References 

 

kk:Б. з. д. 824 жыл